Richard Wood is a British diplomat, who has served as the British Ambassador to Norway since August 2018.

Early life 
Richard John Wood was born on 27 August 1967 in Great Yarmouth in Norfolk, England. Wood is the son of John Michael Wood and Christine Barbara Wood.

Wood was educated at Lynn Grove High School and East Norfolk Sixth Form College. Wood attended Leeds Polytechnic, graduating with a BA (Hons) in European languages and institutions in 1990.

Career 
Wood joined the Foreign and Commonwealth Office (FCO) in 1990. His first role was as Desk Officer for the Single Market, European Presidency, and Gibraltar.

His first foreign posting was as the Second Secretary for internal politics in Cape Town and Pretoria. During his first posting Wood was outed as homosexual to the FCO Security Department by colleagues, and was sent back to Britain and told to expect dismissal. He was allowed to keep his job, but said that he faced "years of resentment and fear".

Ambassador to Norway 
Wood was appointed the British Ambassador to Norway on 23 August 2018.

Personal life 
Wood married his husband Xavier Piot in 2008. They have a dog called Hudson. Wood speaks fluent Norwegian.

References

External links 

1967 births
Living people
British diplomats
Members of HM Diplomatic Service
Ambassadors of the United Kingdom to Norway
20th-century British diplomats
21st-century British diplomats